The Gracias Formation is a geologic formation in Honduras. The mainly sandstones, siltstones and claystones preserve vertebrate fossils dating back to the Neogene period.

Description 
The Gracias Formation is a sedimentary unit, consisting of sandstone, siltstone, claystone and a few conglomeratic beds. The formation overlies the Padre Miguel Group, while it is overlain by Pleistocene basalts. The Padre Miguel Group provided the provenance for the sedimentary material for the Gracias Formation. The clasts in the formation are largely composed of rhyolite, rhyodacite, pumice, vitric ash, quartz, feldspar, and minor biotite fragments.

Fossil content 

 Borophagus secundus	
 Calippus hondurensis
 Cormohipparion ingenuum
 Procamelus cf. grandis
 Prosthennops cf. serus
 Protolabis cf. heterodontus
 Pseudoceras skinneri
 Rhynchotherium cf. blicki
 Teleoceras sp.
 Rhinocerotidae indet.

See also 

 List of fossiliferous stratigraphic units in Honduras

References

Bibliography

Further reading 
 E. C. Olson and P. O. McGrew. 1941. Mammalian fauna from the Pliocene of Honduras. Bulletin of the Geological Society of America 52:1219-1244
 S. D. Webb and S. C. Perrigo. 1984.  Late Cenozoic Vertebrates from Honduras and El Salvador. Journal of Vertebrate Paleontology 4(2):237-254

Geologic formations of Honduras
Neogene Honduras
Sandstone formations
Siltstone formations
Shale formations
Paleontology in Honduras
Lempira Department